Beloha District is a district in the Androy Region, located in southeastern Madagascar.

Communes
The district is further divided into five communes:

 Beloha
 Kopoky
 Marolinta
 Tranoroa
 Tranovaho

References 

Districts of Androy